Bitter Clarity, Uncommon Grace is the fourth album by American hardcore band Verse. It was released on 17 July 2012 through Bridge Nine.

Track listing

References

2012 albums
Verse (band) albums
Bridge 9 Records albums